Coello is a Galician-language Spanish surname, where it means rabbit; it  may refer to:

People
 Alejandro Domínguez Coello (c. 1950–2005), chief of police of Nuevo Laredo, México
 Alonso Sánchez Coello (1531–1588), Spanish painter
 Antonio Coello (1611–1652), Spanish dramatist and poet
 Augusto Coello (1884–1941), who wrote the lyrics for the National Anthem of Honduras
 Carlos A. Coello Coello, Mexican computer scientist
 Claudio Coello (1642–1693), Spanish Baroque painter
 Diego Dávila Coello (c. 1621–c. 1680), 1st Marquis of Navamorcuende, Spanish soldier and colonial administrator
 Juan Manuel Coello (born 1976), Honduran footballer
 Juana Coello (1548–?), wife of Antonio Pérez, Secretary of State of Philip II of Spain
 Mariana Grajales Coello (1808–1893), leader in the struggle for Cuban independence
 Óscar Coello (born 1947), Peruvian poet, professor and literary critic
 Rafael Coello Ramos (1877–1967), Honduran musician and composer, and founder of Orquesta Verdi
 Renán Almendárez Coello (born 1953), Honduran-born L. A. radio host, known as El Cucuy
 Robert Coello (born 1984), American baseball player
 Víctor Coello (born 1974), Honduran footballer

Places
 Coello, Tolima, Colombia
 North City, Illinois, U.S., also known as Coello
 Coello River, Colombia

See also
 
 Coelho, a Portuguese-language variant
 Conejo (surname), a Spanish-language variant
 Conill (disambiguation), a Catalan-language variant

Galician-language surnames